The 2015 Asian Fencing Championships were held in Singapore from 25 to 30 July 2015 at the Singapore Sports Hub in Kallang.

Medal summary

Men

Women

Medal table

Results

Men

Individual épée

Team épée

Individual foil

Team foil

Individual sabre

Team sabre

Women

Individual épée

Team épée

Individual foil

Team foil

Individual sabre

Team sabre

References
Official website
 Detailed results at En Garde

External links
Results at FIE

Asian Championship
2015 Asia
Asian Fencing Championships
Asian Fencing Championships
July 2015 sports events in Asia